Qasem Kandi (also Romanized as Qāsem Kandī) is a village in Mulan Rural District, in the Central District of Kaleybar County, East Azerbaijan Province, Iran. At the 2006 census, its population was 52, in 10 families.

References 

Populated places in Kaleybar County